The Japanese Tower is a Japanese pagoda located in Laeken, Brussels, Belgium. The 5-story tall pagoda measures nearly 50 meters (160 ft) in height, and is part of the Museums of the Far East 3-museum complex. It was built by order of King Leopold II, between 1900 and 1904.

The tower has a combination of decoration and architecture that only a few places in Japan have, and is considered of "genuine historical interest in both Belgium and Japan". The tower was temporarily closed for renovation in 2013, and as of 2022, it is still closed to the public.

History
The tower was built by order of King Leopold II of Belgium. It was commissioned in 1900, and completed in 1904. It was officially inaugurated on 6 May 1905, during the king's yearly garden party. The tower was built by French architect Alexandre Marcel. It has rich interiors, being richly decorated with chased copper panels, stucco, and elaborated stained glass windows. The tower was closed for long periods of time: it was scarcely used after it was built; closed during the two World Wars, and again closed from 1947.

After a study of the upper floors, requested and carried out by the Belgian building agency in 2010, an important ornamental scheme was discovered, partly made of Japanese lacquer.

The Japanese Tower, and the nearby Chinese Pavilion, have been closed for nine years as of 2022. The buildings were put under protection in 2019, and renovation should have finished in 2021. However, as of November 2022, the renovation still has not finished.

Description

The tower combines reused elements manufactured in Japan with the construction of Marcel. Working on timberwork started in 1902. Though Belgian craftsmen built the main part of the tower, they initially opted not use nails, in the traditional Japanese style. Marcel however was not convinced, and ordered to add nails, as well as wooden braces. Marcel, inspired by the Shrines and Temples of Nikkō, mixed Japanese and European techniques for the interiors. The entrance hall from the Panorama du Tour du Monde of the 1900 Paris Exposition, which had been acquired by the king, was reused for this tower. Art dealer Maison Reynaud from Yokohama provided most of the internal and external decorations. The tower has six chambers, connected by a stairwell. The latter is decorated with kinkarakawa-gami panels. These are surrounded by "aventurine" or "bronzine", an European imitation of the Japanese nashiji technique.

The first floor features a polychrome decoration with a legend of Urashima Taro, plus a coffered ceiling with a depiction of musicians. The second floor, known as the "Green Floor", or "Golden Floor", has aventurine applied to wide lacquered wall panels. It has a depiction of mythical figures, including dragons. It originally included a ceiling with a painted vellum canopy depicting a group of women over a landscape, probably inspired by woodblock print by Utagawa Kunisada. This artifact was removed and is today stored at Brussels' Art & History Museum. The third floor, which has the most nashiji decorations, features a "magnificent ceiling similar to the first floor soffit but evoking animals, including remarkable openwork reliefs representing rising and diving dragons." The fourth floor, known as the "Red Floor", features red lacquered wooden panels, to which it owes its nickname, and a large matt Japanese painting on wood. The ceiling has a large marouflaged painting on canvas by French decorator Willemsen, which was inspired by a painting in the Nikko temple as well as woodblock prints by Utagawa Hiroshige. The fifth floor features iconography that focuses on animals, like the second floor, including lions and monkeys. The fifth floor's ceiling was decorated by European artists with marouflaged art nouveau canvas paintings. This floor has a very good panoramic view. Other decorative components were imported from Japan in 1904.

In 2011, to ensure that the problems of this building were well addressed and it was acceptably restored, international experts were consulted. The visit of Professor William Coaldrake and Shigeru Kubodera (September 2012) confirmed the value and importance of this building. They stated:

Only a few places in Japan have a similar combination of decoration and architecture. The interior includes elements from the late Edo and Meiji periods. The latter was the culmination of decorative arts in Japan. The tower reflects this in the sophistication of crafts and technologies employed to decorate its interior, as the apparent extensive use of ikkei saishiki for the doors, pillars and panels will suffice to illustrate.

The tower is located in the Brusselian Museums of the Far East. It is located across the road from the rest of the museum buildings. The Japanese tower and the nearby Chinese pavilion were originally built to store important Chinese and Japanese art collections.

Gallery

See also

 History of Brussels
 Culture of Belgium
 Belgium in "the long nineteenth century"
 Japanese Garden of Hasselt

References

External links

Pagodas in Belgium
Belgium–Japan relations
Buildings and structures in Brussels
Leopold II of Belgium